Texas A&M Astronomical Observatory  is an astronomical observatory owned and operated by Texas A&M University's Department of Physics.  It is located in College Station, Texas, USA. 

Latitude: N 30° 34' 21.78" 
Longitude: W 96° 21' 59.94" 
Elevation: 283 ft. (86.2584 m)

See also 
List of observatories

References
  

Astronomical observatories in Texas
Buildings and structures in Brazos County, Texas
Texas A&M University